The International Federation of Football History & Statistics (IFFHS) is an organisation that chronicles the history and records of association football. It was founded in 1984 by Alfredo Pöge in Leipzig. The IFFHS was based in Abu Dhabi for some time but, in 2010, relocated to Bonn, Germany, and then in 2014 to Zürich.

From its early stages to 2002, the IFFHS concentrated on publishing the quarterly magazines Fußball-Weltzeitschrift, Libero spezial deutsch and Libero international. When these had to be discontinued for reasons which were not officially told, the organisation published its material in a series of multi-lingual books in co-operation with sponsors.  The statistical organisation has now confined its publishing activities to its website. IFFHS has no affiliation with FIFA, but FIFA has cited awards and records conducted by IFFHS on their website.

In 2008, Karl Lennartz, a sports historian and professor at the University of Cologne, Germany, called the organisation "obscure", describing it as a one-man show of its founder Alfredo Pöge. IFFHS rankings and their significance have been a matter of criticism and the largest German news agency, Deutsche Presse-Agentur, refuse to publish them. Furthermore, German die Tageszeitung stated that the IFFHS rankings serves merely for publicity, although Bild, Deutsche Welle, Kicker-Sportmagazin, German Football Association (DFB), and former president of the Association of West German Sports Journalists ( — VWS) Heribert Faßbender have referenced IFFHS.

The World's Best Club 
Since 1991, the entity has produced a monthly Club World Ranking.

The ranking takes into consideration the results of twelve months of continental and intercontinental competitions, national league matches (including play-offs) and the most important national cup (excluding points won before the round of 16).

All countries are rated at four levels based upon the national league performance—clubs in the highest level leagues receive 4 points for each match won, 2 for a draw and 0 for a defeat. Level 2 is assigned 3 pts. (win), 1.5 (draw) and 0 (lost), and so on with the next lower levels.

In continental competitions, all clubs receive the same number of points at all stages regardless of the performance level of their leagues. However, the UEFA Champions League and the Copa Libertadores yield more points than UEFA Europa League and Copa Sudamericana, respectively. The point assignment system is still lower for the AFC, CAF, CONCACAF and OFC continental tournaments. Competitions between two continents are evaluated depending upon their importance. Competitions not organised by a continental confederation, or any intercontinental events not recognized by FIFA, are not taken into consideration.

Men's winners

Continental Men's Clubs of the Century (1901–2000) 

In 2009, the IFFHS released the results of a statistical study series which determined the best continental clubs of the 20th century. The ranking did not consider the performance of the teams in national football tournaments (except in the Oceania's club ranking due to limited editions held under OFC club competitions), the performance in the intercontinental or worldwide club competitions or those submitted in the IFFHS Club World Ranking, available since 1991.

Based on this study, which assigned a weighted score criteria applied for each competition analysed, the below six clubs were named as "continental clubs of the century" by the IFFHS between 10 September and 13 October 2009. These clubs were awarded with a golden trophy and a certificate during the World Football Gala celebrated at Fulham, London, on 11 May 2010.

The Best Man Club of the Decade 
In 2012, the IFFHS recognised Barcelona as the World's Best Club Team of the Decade for the first decade of the 21st century (2001–2010). In 2021, Barcelona were recognised as the world's best club also for the second decade (2011–2020).

Women's winners

The World's Strongest National League

Men's league

The Strongest National League of the Decade

Women's league

The World's Best Player

Men's winners 
From 1991 until 2009, FIFA continued this distinction named "FIFA World Player of the Year"; this award was later replaced by the FIFA Ballon d'Or in 2010, and The Best FIFA Men's Player in 2016. The award was reinstated in 2020.

Women's winners

The World's Best Man Player of the Century (1901–2000)

The World's Best Woman Player of the Century (1901–2000) 

IFFHS gave out an award decided by votes which was conducted with the participation of journalists and former players (no further details given).

The World's Best Youth (U20) Player 

The award was introduced in 2021.

Men's winners

Women's winners

The World's Best Playmaker

Men's winners 
The IFFHS World's Best Playmaker is a footballing award which, since 2006, is given annually to the best playmaker of the year, as chosen by the International Federation of Football History & Statistics (IFFHS).

The award is awarded at the end of the year at the World Football Gala: the winning playmaker is awarded a gold trophy. Argentina's Lionel Messi has won the award a record five times. Spain's Xavi won the award four times, all consecutively, while Spanish compatriot Andrés Iniesta and Belgian Kevin De Bruyne both won the award two times each. Barcelona is the club with the most wins, with ten in total.

Lionel Messi was named the Best Playmaker since 2006 and the Best Playmaker of the Decade 2011–2020.

Women's winners 

Dzsenifer Marozsán was named the Best Playmaker of the Decade 2011–2020.

The World's Best Goalkeeper

Men's winners

Women's winners

The World's Best Top Goal Scorer 

This award is given annually since 2020, and retroactively from 2011 to 2019, to the world's top goalscorer in the calendar year.

Men's winners

All-time World's Best Goal Scorer ranking 

Bold indicates players currently active.

Women's winners 
The women's award was introduced in 2021.

The World's Best International Goal Scorer 
This award is given annually since 1991 to the world's top international goalscorer in the calendar year.

Men's winners

Women's winners 
The women's award was introduced in 2021.

The World's Best Top Division Goal Scorer 

This award is given annually since 1997 to the player who scores the most goals in a league season (in a calendar year since 2020) in any of the top 60 leagues in the world (as ranked by IFFHS for that given year).

Men's winners

All-time World's Best Top Division Goal Scorer ranking 

Bold indicates players currently active.

Women's winners 
The women's award was introduced in 2021.

The World's Most Effective Top Division Goal Scorer 

This award was given annually from 1997 to 2004 to the player with the best goal ratio (goals/matches played) in a league season in any of the top 60 leagues in the world (as ranked by IFFHS for that given year).

Men's winners

The World Team

Men's winners 
In 2017, IFFHS started to nominate a world team of the year.

All-time Men's Dream Team (2021)

Women's winners 
In 2017, IFFHS started to nominate a world team of the year.

All-time Women's Dream Team (2021)

The World Youth (U20) Team 

The award was introduced in 2020.

Men's winners

Women's winners

The World's Best Club Coach

Men's winners

Women's winners

The World's Best National Coach

Men's winners

Women's winners

The World's Best Referee

Men's winners 
Felix Brych was awarded the prize for Men's Referee of the Decade 2011–20.

Women's winners 
Bibiana Steinhaus was awarded the prize for Women's Referee of the Decade 2011–20.

References

External links 
  

 
Association football organizations
Sports organizations established in 1984
1984 establishments in Germany
Association football websites
+
History of association football